Carì (formerly known as Maiensäss) is a village in the Swiss Alps, located in the canton of Ticino. The village is situated in the northern part of the canton, in the Leventina valley, above Faido. It belongs to the latter municipality.

Carì sits on a sunny terrace at a height of 1,642 metres above sea level, on the southern flanks of Pizzo di Campello. Since 1950, the village has developed into one of the most popular alpine tourist resorts of the canton. It is now inhabited all year round, making Carì the highest permanent settlement in the canton of Ticino.

In winter Carì includes 20 km of ski pistes up to Lago di Carì (2,280 m).

The Gotthard Base Tunnel runs below Carì, over one kilometre below the ground. At that point is the Faido multifunction station.

References
Swisstopo topographic maps

External links

Official website 
Carì on Ticino.ch

Villages in Ticino
Ski areas and resorts in Switzerland